Giovanni Antonio Lelli (1591 – August 3, 1640) was an Italian painter of the Baroque period. He was a pupil of the painter Cigoli. In the church of San Matteo in Merulana in Rome (now demolished), he painted an Annunciation. He painted a Visitation for the Convent della Minerva. Giovanni Antonio Lelli also painted a ceiling fresco (now lost) for the church of Santa Lucia in Selci.

References

1591 births
1640 deaths
17th-century Italian painters
Italian male painters
Italian Baroque painters
Painters from Rome
Fresco painters